That's My Uncle is a 1935 British comedy film directed by George Pearson and starring Mark Daly, Richard Cooper and Betty Astell. It was made at Twickenham Studios as a quota quickie for release by Universal Pictures.

Cast
 Mark Daly as Walter Frisbee  
 Richard Cooper as Arthur Twindle  
 Betty Astell as Maudie  
 Margaret Yarde as Mrs. Frisbee  
 Michael Shepley as Chrlie Cookson  
 Wally Patch as Splinty Woods  
 David Horne as Col. Marlowe 
 Hope Davy as Betty Marlowe  
 Ralph Truman as Monty 
 Gladys Hamer 
 Colin Lesslie

References

Bibliography
 Low, Rachael. Filmmaking in 1930s Britain. George Allen & Unwin, 1985.
 Wood, Linda. British Films, 1927-1939. British Film Institute, 1986.

External links

1935 films
British comedy films
1935 comedy films
1930s English-language films
Films shot at Twickenham Film Studios
Films directed by George Pearson
Quota quickies
British black-and-white films
1930s British films